Jean Luc Gbayara Assoubre (born 8 August 1992), known as Jean Luc, is an Ivorian professional footballer who plays as a winger for Primera Divisió club Inter Club d'Escaldes.

Career

Villarreal
Born in Lakota, Ivory Coast, Jean Luc graduated from Villarreal CF's youth academy, making his senior debuts with the C-team in the 2010–11 season, in Tercera División.

On 3 March 2013, Jean Luc first appeared with the reserves, starting in a 2–1 loss at CE L'Hospitalet. He scored his first senior goal on 5 May, netting his side's last of a 2–2 draw at Yeclano Deportivo.

Gimnàstic
On 13 July 2013, Jean Luc joined Gimnàstic de Tarragona in Segunda División B. He made his debut for the club on 15 September, coming on as a late substitute in a 1–0 loss at UE Sant Andreu.

On 29 June 2015, after achieving promotion to Segunda División, Jean Luc signed a new two-year deal with the Catalans. He made his debut in the category on 23 August, starting in a 2–2 home draw against Albacete Balompié.

Jean Luc scored his first professional goal on 30 August 2015, netting the winner in a 2–1 away success over CD Tenerife.

AEK Larnaca
On 29 July 2018, free agent Jean Luc signed for Cypriot club AEK Larnaca. 

On 30 January 2019 he was loaned to Lamia until the end of the season.

AEL
On 1 September 2019, he joined AEL on a free transfer. On 8 December 2019, he scored his first goal in a 1–1 away draw against Asteras Tripolis.

Honours
AEK Larnaca
 Cypriot Super Cup: 2018

References

External links
Gimnàstic official profile 

1992 births
Living people
People from Gôh-Djiboua District
Ivorian footballers
Association football wingers
Segunda División players
Segunda División B players
Tercera División players
Cypriot First Division players
Super League Greece players
Villarreal CF C players
Villarreal CF B players
Gimnàstic de Tarragona footballers
AEK Larnaca FC players
PAS Lamia 1964 players
Ivorian expatriate footballers
Ivorian expatriate sportspeople in Spain
Ivorian expatriate sportspeople in Cyprus
Expatriate footballers in Spain
Expatriate footballers in Cyprus
Expatriate footballers in Greece